Old Blues may refer to the following:

 Former pupils of Bluecoat schools including:
 Christ's Hospital, Horsham, West Sussex, United Kingdom - see List of people educated at Christ's Hospital & :Category:People educated at Christ's Hospital
 Reading Blue Coat School - see :Category:People educated at Reading Blue Coat School